Events in the year 1993 in Eritrea.

Incumbents 

 President: Isaias Afewerki

Events 

 23 – 25 April – An independence referendum was held in the country, which was at the time a part of Ethiopia. The result was 99.83% in favour of independence with a 98.5% turnout.
 27 April – The country declared its independence from Ethiopia.

Deaths

References 

 
1990s in Eritrea
Years of the 20th century in Eritrea
Eritrea
Eritrea